Ivan Plazinić (born 14 February 1998) is a Serbian football forward who plays for LFK Mladost Lučani.

References

External links
 
 Ivan Plazinić stats at utakmica.rs

1998 births
Living people
Sportspeople from Čačak
Association football forwards
Serbian footballers
FK Mladost Lučani players
Serbian SuperLiga players